Scott A. Wolpert is an American mathematician specializing in geometry.  He is a professor at the University of Maryland.

Wolpert received his Ph.D. from Stanford University in 1976.

In 1986 he was an Invited Speaker at the International Congresses of Mathematicians in Berkeley, California.  
In 2012, Wolpert became a fellow of the American Mathematical Society.

Publications

References

Fellows of the American Mathematical Society
Year of birth missing (living people)
Living people
20th-century American mathematicians
University of Maryland, College Park faculty
Stanford University alumni
Geometers
21st-century American mathematicians